Richard Clarke Cabot  (May 21, 1868 – May 7, 1939) was an American physician who advanced clinical hematology, was an innovator in teaching methods, and was a pioneer in social work.

Early life and education
Richard Clarke Cabot was born May 21, 1868, in Brookline, Massachusetts, one of five sons of James Elliot Cabot and Elizabeth (Dwight) Cabot. James Cabot was a philosopher and Harvard University professor who also trained as a lawyer and biographer, and was a friend of Ralph Waldo Emerson.

Professional career

Cabot studied philosophy at Harvard University before switching to medicine.  Inspired by the beliefs of John Dewey, Cabot felt more drawn to action than contemplation, and he admired the work of Teddy Roosevelt and Jane Addams.  After completing his studies in 1892, he turned down the role of the first bacteriologist at Massachusetts General Hospital to work in the hospital's much less prestigious outpatient department.  At this time, outpatient wards dealt mostly with people who couldn't afford inpatient treatment, or for the treatment of incurable chronic conditions such as tuberculosis or diabetes.  This involved working populations who lived in unhealthy, overcrowded accommodation, often recent migrants.

He changed the way that the outpatient department was run, believing that economic, social, family and psychological conditions underpinned many of the conditions that patients presented with.  He envisaged that social workers would work in a complementary relationship with doctors, the former concentrating on physiological health, and the latter on social health.  In addition to this, he saw that social work could improve medicine by providing a critical perspective on it while working alongside it in an organisational setting.  In 1905 Cabot created one of the first positions of  professional social worker in the world, given to Garnet Pelton, and then to Ida Maud Cannon. Although Clarke credited his approach as similar to that of Anne Cummins in London. The hospital refused to support the hiring of social workers, and Cabot had to pay their wages himself.  Pelten developed tuberculosis herself soon after taking up the position and was forced to retire.  Cannon stayed in the position for forty years and became Head of Social Work at the hospital.  Cabot and Cannon pioneered many programs to improve the health of patients, including art classes for psychiatric patients, low-cost meals for patients and research on the social factors that increased a person's likelihood of developing tuberculosis.

In 1917 Cabot took up a position in the Medical Reserve Corps for a year.  He returned briefly to Massachusetts General Hospital in 1918 and then left to take up the position of chair at Harvard's Department of Social Ethics in 1919.  At this time, the hospital agreed to pay the wages of social workers, as up to this point, Cabot had paid the wages of thirteen social workers over the last 12 years.  He went on to write about his experiences in his book Social Work

He is also credited with discovering Cabot rings, and for describing, along with his colleague, Locke, the eponymous Cabot-Locke murmur, a diastolic murmur occasionally heard in severe anemia, unrelated to heart valve abnormalities.

Cabot established a tradition of teaching conferences at Massachusetts General Hospital (MGH) that featured generating differential diagnoses, and founded the long-standing feature of Case Record of MGH in New England Journal of Medicine.

Family and personal life 
Cabot's paternal grandfather, Samuel Cabot, Jr., became a sailor at age 19 and married Elizabeth Perkins, daughter of a successful Boston trader.  Samuel Cabot III later took over the running of the firm.

Richard married Ella Lyman (1866–1934) in 1894; they both held Transcendentalist views. This philosophy, as well as his parents' commitment to philanthropy, had a strong influence on Richard.  Around the end of the 19th century, such ideals were out of favor, with the dominant beliefs at the time being social Darwinism.

See also
Cambridge Somerville Youth Study

References

Further reading
 Burton J. Hendrick (1914). "Teamwork in Healing the Sick," The World's Work, Vol. 27.
 Laurie O'Brien (1985). "'A Bold Plunge into the Sea of Values': The Career of Dr. Richard Cabot," The New England Quarterly, Vol. 58, No. 4.
 Christopher Crenner (2005). Private Practice: In the Early Twentieth-Century Medical Office of Dr. Richard Cabot, The Johns Hopkins University Press.

External links
 
 Works by Richard Clarke Cabot, at JSTOR
 Richard Cabot: Dictionary of Unitarian & Universalist Biography

1868 births
1939 deaths
People from Brookline, Massachusetts
Harvard University alumni
Social care in the United States
Cabot family